Mother Gloria (Spanish:Mamá Gloria) is a 1941 Argentine comedy film directed by Richard Harlan and starring Olinda Bozán, Aída Luz and Pedro Maratea.

The film's sets were designed by the art director Juan Manuel Concado.

Cast
 Olinda Bozán 
 Aída Luz 
 Pedro Maratea 
 Oscar Valicelli 
 Adrián Cuneo 
 Alfredo Jordan 
 Margarita Padín 
 Mario Pugliese Cariño 
 Adolfo Stray 
 Susy del Carril
 Armando Bó 
 Fausto Fornoni
 José Castro 
 Morena Chiolo 
 Juan Carrara 
 Salvador Sinai 
 José Mazilli 
 Alberto Terrones 
 Francisco Carollo 
 Ernesto Lecuona

References

Bibliography 
 Alfred Charles Richard. Censorship and Hollywood's Hispanic image: an interpretive filmography, 1936-1955. Greenwood Press, 1993.

External links 
 

1941 films
1941 comedy films
Argentine comedy films
1940s Spanish-language films
Films directed by Richard Harlan
Films scored by Alejandro Gutiérrez del Barrio
Argentine black-and-white films
1940s Argentine films